Jan Erik Østergaard (born 20 February 1961) is a Danish former road cyclist and cross-country mountain biker. He competed in the men's cross-country mountain biking event at the 1996 Summer Olympics. He also rode in the 1988 Giro d'Italia, finishing 119th overall.

Major results

Road

1991
 2nd Grand Prix OST Manufaktur
 3rd Grand Prix de Waregem
1992
 1st Overall Flèche du Sud
1993
 3rd Grand Prix OST Manufaktur
1996
 2nd Grand Prix Herning
1998
 1st Overall Flèche du Sud
2000
 3rd Overall Flèche du Sud
 3rd Grand Prix OST Manufaktur

Mountain bike

1993
 3rd  UCI World XCO Championships
 3rd National XCO Championships
1995
 1st  National XCO Championships
 3rd  UCI World XCO Championships
 3rd Overall UCI XCO World Cup
1st Budapest
1st Plymouth
1997
 3rd National XCO Championships
1998
 3rd National XCO Championships

Cyclo-cross

1984
 3rd National Championships
1985
 2nd National Championships
1990
 1st Grand Prix Möbel Alvisse
1992
 3rd National Championships
1993
 2nd National Championships

References

External links
 

1961 births
Living people
Danish male cyclists
Olympic cyclists of Denmark
Cyclists at the 1996 Summer Olympics
People from Vejle Municipality
Sportspeople from the Region of Southern Denmark